Cotabato's 1st congressional district is one of the three congressional districts of the Philippines in the province of Cotabato. It has been represented in the House of Representatives since 1987. The district covers western Cotabato, bordered on three sides by the province of Maguindanao and which, since 2019, contains several exclaves of the Bangsamoro autonomous region. It consists of the municipalities of Alamada, Aleosan, Libungan, Midsayap, Pigcawayan and Pikit. Prior to redistricting in 2012, the district also included the municipalities of Banisilan, Carmen and Kabacan. It is currently represented in the 19th Congress by Joselito S. Sacdalan of the PDP–Laban.

Representation history

Election results

2019

2016

2013

1994

See also
Legislative districts of Cotabato

References

Congressional districts of the Philippines
Politics of Cotabato
1987 establishments in the Philippines
Congressional districts of Soccsksargen
Constituencies established in 1987